General Pierce may refer to:

Clinton A. Pierce (1894–1966), U.S. Army brigadier general
Franklin Pierce (1804–1869), New Hampshire Militia brigadier general and later President of the United States
Harold E. Pierce (1922–2006), U.S. Air Force brigadier general
John L. Pierce (1895–1959), U.S. Army brigadier general
Kirk S. Pierce (fl. 1980s–2020s), U.S. Air Force lieutenant general
Palmer E. Pierce (1865–1940), U.S. Army brigadier general

See also
William S. Peirce (general) (1864–1923), U.S. Army brigadier general
General Pearce (disambiguation)